East Fork of West Fork Mojave River is a tributary stream of the West Fork Mojave River, itself a tributary of the Mojave River, in the San Bernardino Mountains of San Bernardino County, California. Its mouth originally was at its confluence with the West Fork Mojave River which is now submerged under Lake Silverwood.

References

West Fork Mojave River
West Fork Mojave River
West Fork Mojave River
Rivers of Southern California